The Brick (English: Brig, referring to the class of sailing ship) is a French sailboat that was designed by Jean-Jacques Herbulot and first built in 1964.

Production
The design was built by Chantier Mallard starting in 1964 and by Archambault Boats of Dangé-Saint-Romain, France, starting in 1967, but it is now out of production. Archambault, which had been founded in 1967, went out of business in 2015.

Design
The Brick is a recreational keelboat, built predominantly of wood. It has a 9/10 fractional sloop rig, with a single set of unswept spreaders. The hull has a raked stem, a raised reverse transom, a skeg-mounted rudder controlled by a tiller and a fixed fin keel. The deck has a reverse sheer.

It displaces  and carries  of ballast.

See also
List of sailing boat types

References

Keelboats
1960s sailboat type designs
Sailing yachts
Sailboat type designs by Jean-Jacques Herbulot
Sailboat types built by Archambault Boats
Sailboat types built by Chantier Mallard